Deir Sunbul  is a Syrian village located in Qalaat al-Madiq Subdistrict in Al-Suqaylabiyah District, Hama.  According to the Syria Central Bureau of Statistics (CBS), Deir Sunbul had a population of 1037 in the 2004 census.

References 

Populated places in al-Suqaylabiyah District
Populated places in Jabal Zawiya